Metschnikowiidae is a family of sponges belonging to the order Spongillida.

Genera:
 Metschnikowia Grimm, 1876

References

Sponge families